Phanerota fasciata is a species of rove beetle in the family Staphylinidae. It is found in North America. It lives in the gills of mushrooms both as a larva and adult.

References

Further reading

 

Aleocharinae
Articles created by Qbugbot
Beetles described in 1834
Taxa named by Thomas Say
Beetles of North America